Iridomyrmex viridigaster is a species of ant in the genus Iridomyrmex. Endemic to Australia, though not very common, it was described by John S. Clark in 1941.

References

Iridomyrmex
Hymenoptera of Australia
Insects described in 1941